The 1998 Tour de Hongrie was the 27th edition of the Tour de Hongrie cycle race and was held from 23 to 30 August 1998. The race started and finished in Budapest. The race was won by Aleksandr Rotar.

General classification

References

1998
Tour de Hongrie
Tour de Hongrie